Stadt Zürich may refer to:

 Zurich, a city in Switzerland
 Stadt Zürich (ship, 1855), a Swiss paddle steamer
 Stadt Zürich (ship, 1909), a Swiss paddle steamer